Cottonade was a coarse and heavy cotton cloth usually yarn dyed. There were multiple formations available, including plain, twill, and serge. It was a kind of woolen imitation, and the strong variants were used for men's trousers. Twill structured blue and white striped men's workwear with hickory cloth-like appearance was used. Cottonade was initially used for less expensive men's clothing, it was eventually supplanted by superior materials such as "cassimeres", which became fashionable.

Hickory shirting 
Hickory shirting was a similar cloth made with dyed yarn stripes in twill structure. When cottonade was used for trousers, hickory was used for shirts.

See also 
 Gabardine

References 

Woven fabrics